Absolute Anthology 1965 to 1969 is a compilation album by Australian rock band The Easybeats, released on November 17, 1980. The album was compiled by Australian rock journalist Glenn A. Baker.  It features singles, EP, album tracks, unreleased studio & demo recordings and other rarities spanning the group's recording career. It reached #37 on the Australian albums charts. This album was re-released in 1986 on compact disc.

The album was remastered by Don Bartley 
and reissued on compact disc in Australia on 29 September 2017   This was a 4 CD disc release with no additional content and each disc containing the tracklisting of each side of the original vinyl LP.

Track listing
Disc 1

Tracks written by Stevie Wright & George Young except where listed.

Disc 2

Tracks written by Harry Vanda & George Young except where listed.

Charts

References

External links
 Albert Music - Absolute Anthology
[ allmusic - The Absolute Anthology]

 

The Easybeats albums
1980 compilation albums
Albums produced by Shel Talmy
Albums produced by Glyn Johns
Albert Productions compilation albums